Scott Hale Reiniger, Harlan Sahib Bahadur, Prince of Ghor (born September 5, 1948) is an American actor. He is best known as one of the stars of the 1978 classic horror film Dawn of the Dead.

Biography
Scott Hale Reiniger, Jr. was born in White Plains, New York. He is a graduate of Rollins College in Theater Arts.

Following his appearance as Roger in George A. Romero's original Dawn of the Dead in 1978, Reiniger played Marhalt in Romero's 1981 film Knightriders. He also made a cameo appearance in the 2004 remake of Dawn of the Dead directed by Zack Snyder.

He currently teaches at the American Academy of Dramatic Arts in Hollywood. Mr. Reiniger continues to attend horror conventions around the world.

Afghan lineage 
In 2004 it was revealed that Reiniger is the "Prince of Ghor," a province in western Afghanistan. Reiniger's great, great, great grandfather, Josiah Harlan, was the first American to set foot in Afghanistan. Harlan was granted sovereignty, in perpetuity, for himself and his descendants by Refee Beg in exchange for military support. The Hazaras had been raided by Uzbek warlords, particularly Murad Beg, and were nominal vassals of the Emperor of Afghanistan.

The Emir Dost Mohammad Khan sent Josiah Harlan with an armed group to collect tribute from the Hazaras. The Hazara leaders, of whom the most prominent was Refee Beg, offered to send tribute if Harlan would unite them in the struggle against the raiding Uzbek warlords. The agreement reached included Harlan being made hereditary paramount ruler and advocate. The British arriving later negotiated with the Emperor for the departure and loss of temporal power of Harlan.

In his later life, Josiah Harlan continued advocating for the Hazaras. Reiniger has expressed mild interest in the title and suggests passing it to his younger brother, Harlan Reiniger, a historian and PBS documentary producer. But in general, he considers the title an anecdote and curiosity of no real-world importance.

Filmography

Television

References

External links
 Scott Reiniger's Official Fansite
 
New York Times August 16 1970 Scott H. Reiniger, Jr. Weds Mary Gilbert
CrypticRock.com's interview with Scott H. Reiniger

1948 births
Living people
American male film actors
Male actors from New York (state)
Rollins College alumni
Princes